Thomas Godwin may refer to:

Thomas Godwin (bishop) (1517–1590), English bishop
Thomas Godwin (politician) (died 1677/8), Virginia colonial politician
Tom Godwin (1915–1980), American science fiction writer
Tommy Godwin (footballer) (1927–1996), Irish footballer
Tommy Godwin (cyclist, born 1912) (1912–1975), English cyclist and world record holder for miles covered in a year
Tommy Godwin (cyclist, born 1920) (1920–2012), British track cyclist active during the 1940s and 1950s

See also
Thomas Godwyn (1587–1642), English headmaster and scholar
Thomas Goodwin (disambiguation)